Philippe Boccara (born July 6, 1959) is a French-born American sprint kayaker who competed from the late 1970s to the early 2000s (decade).
He appeared in six Olympics for France (1980 to 1992) and the United States (1996, 2000).

He won a bronze medal for France in the K-4 1000 m event at the 1984 Olympics with teammates François Barouh, Pascal Boucherit, and Didier Vavasseur.

Boccara also won six medals for the French at the ICF Canoe Sprint World Championships with four golds (K-1 10000 m: 1990, K-2 1000 m: 1985, K-2 10000 m: 1987, 1991), a silver (K-2 1000 m: 1987), and a bronze (K-1 1000 m: 1990).

In 2000, he became the first Kayaker to compete at six Olympics. This was matched four years later by German-born Italian Josefa Idem-Guerrini and German Birgit Fischer. (Idem-Guerrini went on in 2008 to become the first canoeist to compete at seven Olympics.)

He is the first French-born athlete to compete at six Olympics. This was matched by legendary French cyclist Jeannie Longo in 2004 and surpassed by her in 2008.

See also
List of athletes with the most appearances at Olympic Games

References

1959 births
Living people
French male canoeists
French emigrants to the United States
Olympic canoeists of France
Olympic canoeists of the United States
Olympic bronze medalists for France
Olympic medalists in canoeing
ICF Canoe Sprint World Championships medalists in kayak
Medalists at the 1984 Summer Olympics
Canoeists at the 1980 Summer Olympics
Canoeists at the 1984 Summer Olympics
Canoeists at the 1988 Summer Olympics
Canoeists at the 1992 Summer Olympics
Canoeists at the 1996 Summer Olympics
Canoeists at the 2000 Summer Olympics